Demography is the statistical of human population. It encompasses the study of the size, structure, and distribution of populations. Peja has a demographic that includes a composition of the all population, according to different categories.

History 

Peja is known as a city since the Illyrians time. Due to the recent wars, the Ottoman evasion at the beginning, then the last war with Serbia, brought Peja serious losses, in which case it was not possible to preserve all Illyrian features. In Illyrian times Peja was a major residential center. It lies in the north-western edge of the Metohija valley before the gorge of the scenic Rugova Mountain. Komuna e Pejes

Population by type of settlement, sex and basic contingents 

From the last recordings made in 2011, which included a population census and household registration, the majority of people were included. Peja has a population of approximately 96.450 people, where most of them live in the urban area 48.962, whereas 47.448 in the rural part.

Male and female population 

Part of demography which has to do with population, is associated with the part of the population which includes gender, male and female. Peja  has a population which consists of 24.262 males living in the urban area, whereas 23.890 in the rural area. However, women who live in the urban area consist of 48.298, whereas in the rural area it is 23.598.

Population by gender and ethnicity 

In recordings made in 2011 in the town of Peja, data for gender and ethnic group were presented from the collection of citizens self declaration. Data about gender and ethnicity in censuses from the Statistical Agency of Kosovo  are as follows: total female and men are 96.450, from which 48,152 consists of males and 48,298 females. While according to other data about ethnicity they consist of:
 Albanian 87,975, male 44,025, female 43,948 
 Serbs 332, male 166, female 166. 
 Turkish 59, male 30, female 29. 
 Bosnian 3,786, male 1,808, female 1,978
 Roma 993, male 466, female 527
 Ashkali 143, male 71, female 72
 Egyptian 2,700, male 1,383, female 1,317
 Gorani 189, male 96, female, 93
 Others 132, male 38, female 94

Population by sex and religion

Children born and infant mortality 
Infant Mortality is the mortality rate of infants and children before they become five years old. Around the world ten million children and infants die before they reach the age of five. 99% of these deaths are from underdeveloped countries. The reasons for these deaths can be various, for example psychological, social. Also, there are many factors that contribute to infant mortality such as maternal education level, environmental conditions, political and medical infrastructure etc. There are three forms of mortality:
 It is death which occurs 28 days after birth. Neonatal death is attributed the lack of care during pregnancy and after birth. It consists of 40-60 % of infant mortality in developing countries.
 Mortality posteonatale is the death of the child 29 days after birth. The main causes of this disease are: malnutrition, infectious diseases etc.
 Mortality Perinatal is the death of the newborns up to a week after birth.

Population by aged 10+ by completed education

Population 10+ without completed education level by literacy 
The data for reading and writing are collected for the people who are over ten years old and have not attended, formal education, as well as for those who have not completed any level of education.
 Total:
 Knows how to read and write, total 4,115 male 1909, female, 2206
 Illiterate doesn't know how to read and write, total 2,836, male 626, female 2210
 Total male, 784, female 2511, both gender 3,295
2 No formal education:
 Knows how to read and write, total 947, male 304, female 643
 Illiterate doesn't know how to read and write, total 2,348, male 480, female 1868
 Total male 1751, female 1905, both gender 3,656
3 No completed education level:
 Knows how to read and write, total 3,168, male 1605, female 1563
 Illiterate doesn't know how to read and write, total 488, male 146, female 342
 Total male 2535, female 4416, both gender 6951

Population by sex and place of birth

Population by sex and citizenship 
Citizenship is defined as a legal connection which has to do with an individual's relationship with his or her state. It is acquired by birth, naturalism, marriage or other means according to national Legislation.

References 

Peja
Peja